Michael Zellmer (born 14 August 1977) is a German water polo player who competed in the 2004 Summer Olympics and 2008 Summer Olympics.

See also
 Germany men's Olympic water polo team records and statistics
 List of men's Olympic water polo tournament goalkeepers

Further reading 
 Wolfgang Philipps: Vergangenheit und Zukunft. 100 Jahre Waspo Hannover-Linden: 1913 – 2013, Hannover 2013 (in German)

References

External links
 
 Michael "MIZE" Zellmer - XquiX

1977 births
Living people
Water polo goalkeepers
German male water polo players
Olympic water polo players of Germany
Water polo players at the 2004 Summer Olympics
Sportspeople from Oldenburg